Martin Muhr (born June 17, 1971) is a strongman from Germany. He participated in the World's Strongest Man finals of 2000 and 2001.

Biography 
Muhr was born in Bad Kötzting, Bavaria. In 1998 he was invited to the World's Strongest Man for the first time but did not make it past the qualifying heats. At the 2000 World's Strongest Man he finished second in his qualifying group which placed him in the final where he would finish sixth.  A year later he was invited again and made it to the final once again and finished fifth. His best result at the World's Strongest Man. In 2001 he also placed second in Germany's Strongest Man.

Honours
6th place World's Strongest Man  (2000)
5th place World's Strongest Man  (2001)

References

External links
 Personal website

1971 births
Living people
German strength athletes
Sportspeople from the Upper Palatinate
People from Bad Kötzting